Down the Rabbit Hole Live was the fifth headlining concert tour by American country music group the Zac Brown Band, in support of their fifth studio album Welcome Home (2017). The tour began on June 8, 2018, in Lincoln, Nebraska and concluded on April 27, 2019, in Peoria, Illinois

Background
The band announced the tour in January 2018. Fourteen of the shows took place at Major League Baseball stadiums. OneRepublic, Leon Bridges, Nahko and Medicine for the People, Mark O’Connor Band, Darrell Scott, and Caroline Jones supported the first leg of the tour. The second leg was announced in November 2018.

Commercial reception
Their first night at Fenway Park marked their eighth consecutive sold-out performance at the park which broke a venue record. They also hold a record at Fenway for the most tickets sold out of any act to perform there.

Their show on June 23, 2018, at Lakeview Amphitheater in Syracuse, New York, has been reportedly sold out. This is the second year in a row they have sold out that venue.

Critical reception
Kevin Coffey of the Omaha World-Herald who attended opening night in Lincoln, thought that the choice of covers were interesting. During their cover of Hozier's "Take Me to Church", he said that, "it didn't fit with the show and Brown's velvety voice also didn't fit the song." He also wasn't too fond of their cover of Billy Joel's "The Longest Time".

Setlist
The following setlist comes from opening night in Lincoln, Nebraska on June 8, 2018.

"Day for the Dead"
"Keep Me in Mind"
"As She's Walking Away"
"Whiskey's Gone"
"Next to Me" 
"Day That I Die"
"Sweet Annie"
"Tomorrow Never Comes"
"No Roots"
"No Roots" 
"Free"/"Into the Mystic" 
"Take Me to Church" 
"Knee Deep"
Intermission
"The Longest Time"
"Colder Weather"
"Loving You Easy"
"Goodbye in Her Eyes"
"Beautiful Drug"
"In My Blood" 
"Eleanor Rigby" 
Medley: "Leader of the Band"/"My Old Man"/"The Living Years"
"From Now On" 
"With a Little Help from My Friends" 
"Chicken Fried"
"Homegrown"
Encore
"Cult of Personality" 
"Paint It Black" 
"Bennie and the Jets" 
"Long Train Runnin'" 
"Tush" 
"Thank You 
"Despacito" 
"Man in the Box" 
"Thunderstruck" 
"Sabotage"

Tour dates

Notes
The Charlotte and Raleigh shows on September 13 and 14, 2018, were canceled due to Hurricane Florence. They were rescheduled for April 13 and 14, 2019.

Band
Zac Brown – banjo, bass guitar, guitar, lead vocals
Jimmy De Martini – backing vocals, fiddle, guitar, mandolin
John Driskell Hopkins – backing vocals, banjo, baritone guitar, ukulele, upright bass 
Coy Bowles – guitar, Hammond organ, piano, slide guitar
Clay Cook – guitar, Hammond organ, piano, slide guitar
Chris Fryer – drums, percussion
Daniel De Los Reyes – percussion
Matt Mangano – bass guitar

References

2018 concert tours
2019 concert tours
Zac Brown Band concert tours